Pursuit is a 2022 American action film directed by Brian Skiba and starring Emile Hirsch and John Cusack.

Synopsis

Detective Breslin crosses paths with Calloway, a ruthless hacker who's trying to save his kidnapped wife from a drug cartel. When Calloway escapes from police custody, Breslin joins forces with a no-nonsense cop to reclaim his prisoner.

Cast
Emile Hirsch as Rick Calloway
John Cusack as John Calloway
Jake Manley as Detective Mike Breslin
William Katt as Taye Biggs

Production
Principal photography took place in Little Rock, Arkansas in July 2021.  Filming has wrapped as of November 2021.

Reception
The film has a 9% rating on Rotten Tomatoes based on 11 reviews.

Julian Roman of MovieWeb gave the film a positive review and wrote, "Pursuit is a bloody and twisted pulp actioner with an insane body count.(...) The film has a spectacularly convoluted plot but keeps the adrenaline pumping with gritty action scenes."

Lisa Kennedy of The New York Times gave the film a mixed review and wrote, "In a previous era, this action thriller, directed by Brian Skiba, would have gone from postproduction directly into a bargain bin at a rundown video emporium on a dark alley where rats scurried."

References

External links
 

2020s English-language films
Films directed by Brian Skiba